Gennady Olegovich Logofet (15 April 1942 – 5 December 2011) was a Soviet and Russian football player and football coach.

Career
Logofet earned 17 caps for the USSR national team as a defender between 1963 and 1970, and participated in UEFA Euro 1968 and the 1970 FIFA World Cup in Mexico. He spent his 15-year career with Spartak Moscow. 

He was a coach of the USSR Under-21s, an assistant with the national team and Spartak, and the coach of FC Maccabi Moscow.

Honours
Spartak Moscow
 Soviet Top League: 1962, 1969
 Soviet Cup: 1963, 1965, 1971

References

External links
Profile (in Russian)

1942 births
2011 deaths
Soviet footballers
Association football defenders
Soviet Union international footballers
UEFA Euro 1968 players
1970 FIFA World Cup players
FC Spartak Moscow players
Soviet Top League players
Soviet football managers
Russian football managers
SC Tavriya Simferopol managers